Yoervis José Medina (born July 27, 1988) is a Venezuelan professional baseball pitcher, who played in Major League Baseball (MLB) for the Seattle Mariners and Chicago Cubs.

Career

Seattle Mariners
From 2006 to 2009, Medina played for the VSL Mariners in the Venezuelan Summer League. In 2006, he made 17 appearances, four of which were starts. That season, he went 3-4 with a 3.60 ERA. In 2007, he went 4-2 with a 3.42 ERA in 16 games (six starts). He was used almost entirely as a reliever in 2008, going 4-3 with a 1.79 ERA in 17 games (one start). In 2009, he went 3-4 with a 2.65 ERA in 15 games (13 starts).

Medina moved to the United States for the 2010 season, playing for the Everett AquaSox, Clinton LumberKings and Tacoma Rainiers and going a combined 9-2 with a 3.17 ERA in 15 starts. In 82⅓ innings, he struck out 92 batters while walking 31.

Medina made his MLB debut with the Mariners in 2013. He appeared in 63 games that season and posted a 4-6 record and 2.91 ERA. He pitched in 66 games in 2014. He appeared in 12 games with the Mariners in 2015.

Chicago Cubs
On May 19, 2015, Medina was traded to the Chicago Cubs for Welington Castillo. He joined the Triple A Iowa Cubs. He was designated for assignment on August 1 and re-added to the roster in September.

Pittsburgh Pirates
Medina was claimed off waivers from the Cubs by the Pittsburgh Pirates on December 23, 2015.

Philadelphia Phillies
On February 3, 2016, Medina was acquired by the Philadelphia Phillies in a trade that sent pitcher Jesse Biddle to the Pirates.

Medina was released by the Phillies on July 3, 2016.

See also
 List of Major League Baseball players from Venezuela

References

External links

Yoervis Medina at Pura Pelota (Venezuelan Professional Baseball League)

1988 births
Living people
Águilas del Zulia players
Arizona League Mariners players
Cardenales de Lara players
Chicago Cubs players
Clinton LumberKings players
Everett AquaSox players
Florida Complex League Phillies players
High Desert Mavericks players
Iowa Cubs players
Jackson Generals (Southern League) players
Major League Baseball pitchers
Major League Baseball players from Venezuela
People from Puerto Cabello
Seattle Mariners players
Tacoma Rainiers players
Tiburones de La Guaira players
Venezuelan expatriate baseball players in the United States
Venezuelan Summer League Mariners players
Expatriate baseball players in Nicaragua